John Knyvet was an English lawyer and administrator.

John Knyvet may also refer to:

John Knyvet (MP for Huntingdonshire) (died 1418), MP for Huntingdonshire
John Knyvet (MP for Northamptonshire) (died 1445), MP for Northamptonshire